Sannicola is a town and comune in the Italian province of Lecce in the Apulia region of south-east Italy.

History
Sannicola the town contains an old Roman defensive tower to protect it against Saracene, Norman and Venetian invaders.

References

External links

Cities and towns in Apulia
Localities of Salento